Lichterman Nature Center is a certified arboretum and nature center located in East Memphis, Tennessee. It has many outdoor and indoor animal exhibits, as well as several activities and events. The Lichterman Nature Center is one of the facilities within the Pink Palace Family of Museums.

Introduction
Through environmental education and interpretation of native wildlife, Lichterman Nature Center fosters a sense of stewardship for the earth by heightening the visitor's appreciation and understanding of the natural world. The nature center places an emphasis on nature related education, including hands-on explorations, microscopic discoveries, a forest boardwalk three stories high, and an underwater viewing area.

Among the many attractions are the Visitor Center which showcases interactive exhibits; preserved specimen animal exhibits with hands on petting patches of fur of the featured animals; a lake cam; and the Nature Store offering nature oriented educational materials including gifts, books, and toys. The Backyard Wildlife Center provides a variety of living and interactive exhibits about the three distinct habitats represented at the Nature Center: lake, meadow, and forest.

The  wildlife observation area includes a three-mile (5 km) nature path which is home to a wide variety of native plants, birds, reptiles, amphibians, and mammals.  The Nature Center no longer accepts wounded or abandoned wild animals and no longer has veterinarian staff on site.

Events
Also included on the property is a special events pavilion providing a sheltered place for meetings, family reunions, receptions, and overnight youth programs.  The amphitheatre features an intimate staging area for outdoor programs.

Throughout the year, Lichterman Nature Center hosts several events open to the public including plant sales; Earthfest; Discovery Days; Privet Pulls; and specialized programs for school age children as well as adults.

Access
The center is located off Ridgeway at 5992 Quince Road in East Memphis. Family memberships for the Pink Palace Family of Museums are honored at Lichterman Nature Center.

The center offers free maps of the property but accepts and depends upon public donations and volunteers for support.

See also
 List of nature centers in Tennessee
 List of museums in Tennessee

References

External links
Lichterman Nature Center's Home Page

Arboreta in Tennessee
Nature centers in Tennessee
Museums in Memphis, Tennessee
Natural history museums in Tennessee
Tourist attractions in Memphis, Tennessee
Parks in Memphis, Tennessee